La Sal may refer to the following places in the United States:

 La Sal Mountains, Utah
 La Sal, Utah, a census-designated place
 La Sal National Forest, Utah and Colorado

See also
 La Salle (disambiguation)